Kalina (German Kallina)  is a village in the administrative district of Gmina Herby, within Lubliniec County, Silesian Voivodeship, in southern Poland.

The village has a population of 381.

References

Kalina